Humongous is a 1982 Canadian slasher film directed by Paul Lynch, and starring Janet Julian, John Wildman, and David Wallace. The story centers on a group of young adults who become stranded on a deserted island, where they are stalked and murdered by a monstrous assailant.

Plot
During Labor Day weekend in 1946, young, virginal Ida Parsons innocuously plays as her father hosts a raucous party at his home on Lake Michigan. Amid the festivities, an older, drunken man named Tom Rice staggers outside and propositions Ida. When she refuses, he chases her into the woods and brutally rapes her; her dogs break out of their pen and they attack and fatally maul Ida's rapist.

Thirty-six years later, in 1982, Waspy brothers Eric and Nick are borrowing their father's yacht to take their girlfriends, Sandy and Donna, on a weekend outing along with their sister, Carla, to St. Martin Island. At the outset of the trip. As the tensions rise between Nick and Eric, Donna and Sandy engage in girl-talk, and geeky Carla silently laments that she is the sole member of the cruise who came along without a significant other.

That night, fog settles in; Eric and Nick, hearing cries out on the water, discover and rescue a shipwrecked fisherman named Bert. Bert informs them that he wrecked offshore Dog Island, the home of lumber baroness Ida Parsons, who has used her family fortune to hole herself up on the island for the past thirty-five years; only making two annual voyages onto the mainland for necessary supplies, and never speaking to anyone during these trips. Recovering from the onset of hypothermia, Bert tells the quintet a campfire story about the savagery of the wild dogs which roam Ida's island, acting as her sentries. Wrecking their boat after Nick, in a panic, attempts to steer the boat back to the mainland.

Donna, Eric, Sandy, Nick, and Bert wash up on so-called "Dog Island;" Bert has been seriously wounded, and Carla is nowhere to be found. Nick wanders off into the woods, and is subsequently killed by a hulking figure that breaks down the shed where Nick hides. The next morning, Sandy and Eric go off onto the island, hoping that Ida Parsons will help them get back to the mainland. Shortly after they leave the beach, Bert goes into shock, and Donna desperately tries to warm him. Seconds later, the same figure which killed Nick sneaks up behind Donna and Bert, fatally hurling Donna against a rock wall and decapitating Bert.

At the center of the island, Sandy and Eric discover Ida's fortified cabin, as well as the fact that all of Ida's dogs have died long ago, their mutilated skeletons lying in their pens. In Ida's boathouse, the duo discover Carla alive hiding under a tarp; she apparently washed up at another point on the beach and made it to the compound in the middle of the night.

In the course of exploring Ida's compound, Eric, Sandy and Carla discover a dust-covered nursery full of antique toys, and a cobweb-covered crib; they also discover Ida Parson's diary, which contains insane, rambling passages about giving birth to a sick child, which she intends to keep sinless by secluding him from all the evils of the outside world. As they continue exploring the house, Sandy comes across Ida's skeletal corpse in repose in her bedroom. The group decides to collect supplies and head back to the shore to collect the rest of their party so they can formulate an escape from the island in Ida's old rowboat. While exploring the basement, they discover the corpses of Nick and Donna and flee to the beach in a panic.

Eric and Sandy deduce that Ida Parson's 35-year-old mutant son was the one behind the murders, left insane by his life of solitude under the care of the imbalanced Ida. With nothing to do but learn from Ida and explore the wilderness, he has become immensely strong, a capable tracker and hunter, and is thoroughly convinced that all outsiders are a threat to him and his mother. With the death of Ida, he was left without any basis for reality and ended up eating the dogs to survive.

Eric and Sandy go back to the house and get the matches that Sandy dropped earlier. Ida's son attacks, breaking down the door. Eric attempts to fight using a broken branch, but the mutant grapples with him and fatally breaks his back. He then chases Sandy upstairs into his mother's bedroom, where she wraps a blanket around her head and, playing Ida, convinces the mutant to leave his mother's bedroom. When Sandy leaves, the mutant pursues her to the boathouse, where she runs headlong into Carla. The mutant grabs Carla and fatally crushes her face. Sandy manages to lure the man into Ida's boathouse, which she sets on fire; although severely burned in the blaze, he still manages to attack Sandy, chasing her up a hill where she yanks a sharp signpost from the ground and impales him. As he dies, his burned, deformed face is finally seen.

Traumatized by the deaths of her friends and the killing she has been forced to commit, Sandy sits alone on Ida's dock, strongly resembling a scarred and traumatized Ida.

Cast

 Janet Julian as Sandy Ralston
 David Wallace as Eric Simmons
 John Wildman as Nick Simmons
 Janit Baldwin as Carla Simmons
 Joy Boushel as Donna Blake
 Layne Coleman as Bert Defoe (as Lane Coleman)
 Shay Garner as Ida Parsons (as Shea Garner)
 Page Fletcher as Tom Rice
 John McFadyen as Ed Parsons
 Garry Robbins as Ida's son

Release

Critical reception

Contemporaneous
Humongous received mostly negative reviews upon its initial release. Author and film critic Leonard Maltin gave the film one and a half out of a possible four stars, calling the film "slow-moving", and criticizing the film's overuse of cliches, lack of visibility, and lack of clear shots of the monster. AllMovie's review of the film was negative, calling it a "plodding horror bore" and commenting, "whatever interest this deathly dull flick may have mustered is completely obscured by some of the murkiest cinematography on record; the fact that nearly every scene is shrouded in complete darkness may prove a blessing in disguise." Tim Brayton from Antagony & Ecstasy gave the film a negative review calling the film "Junk" and criticized the film's characterization as being "of limited interest" but complimented the film's unique villain and being better acted than most slasher films. Justin Kerswell from Hysteria Lives! awarded the film 2.5/5 stars, writing, "HUMONGOUS seems to desperately want to be a hefty helping of true American Gothic, but in reality it's far too cheesy to be very macabre or even generate many true thrills."

Contemporary
Over the years, contemporary reviews have been more positive of the film. For the film's 35th Anniversary, Dave J. Wilson  from Dread Central wrote a retrospective on the film, noting its similarities with Joe D'Amato's 1980 film Antropophagus, which Wilson felt "undeservedly achieved cult status". In his retrospective, Wilson stated that, while the film was no classic, it didn't deserve the obscurity and abysmal reviews that it was given. Wilson concluded his assessment by writing, "Under-seen and unfairly maligned, there is not much to dislike about Humongous... aside from Nick and Donna. Atmospheric, brutal, sleazy, suspenseful and tense, a monstrous villain, and an energetic finale, this is an entertaining little slasher flick."

Todd Martin from HorrorNews.net called the film "great little flick that has gone somewhat unnoticed for way too long". In his review, Martin commended the film's premise, death scenes, soundtrack, and suspense; while criticizing the poor lighting of some scenes. Kurt Dahlke from DVD Talk wrote in his review of the film, "Though derivative of other Slasher Movies, plagued by the annoying improbabilities of all A-to-B horror efforts, filled with bickering dorks, and pretty slow to get started, Humongous eventually gets to a weird, frenetic payoff". Tom Becker from DVD Verdict also gave the film a positive review. In his review on the film Becker commented, "While it might not be the shocker it should be, Humongous is a pretty entertaining bit of horror fluff from the days when people took this stuff seriously". Jack Sommersby from eFilmCritic.com awarded the film a score of 3/4 stating, "It's perfect for audiences looking for an undemanding, scary good time, along with those longing to see the drop-dead gorgeous Janet Julian in a skimpy bikini".

Although, reception from critics have remained negative. On review aggregator website Rotten Tomatoes, it has an approval rating of 0% based on six reviews.

Home Media

Humongous made its debut on DVD on Nov 15, 2011 where it was released by Scorpion Releasing. It has also been released on Blu-ray by Scorpion Releasing.

References

External links
 
 
 
 

1982 films
1982 horror films
1982 independent films
1980s monster movies
1980s slasher films
1980s teen horror films
Canadian independent films
Canadian slasher films
English-language Canadian films
Fictional characters with disfigurements
Films about rape
Films directed by Paul Lynch
Films scored by John Mills-Cockell
Films set in 1946
Films set in 1982
Films set in Michigan
Films set on uninhabited islands
Films shot in Ontario
1980s English-language films
1980s Canadian films